Pseudechiniscus is a genus of tardigrades in the family Echiniscidae. The genus was named and described by Gustav Thulin in 1911.

Species
The genus includes the following species:

 Pseudechiniscus alberti Dastych, 1987
 Pseudechiniscus asper Abe, Utsugi & Takeda, 1998
 Pseudechiniscus bartkei Węglarska, 1962
 Pseudechiniscus beasleyi Li, Wang & Yu, 2007
 Pseudechiniscus bidenticulatus Bartoš, 1963
 Pseudechiniscus bispinosus (Murray, 1907)
 Pseudechiniscus brevimontanus Kendall-Fite & Nelson, 1996
 Pseudechiniscus chengi Xue, Li, Wang, Xian & Chen, 2017
 Pseudechiniscus clavatus Mihelčič, 1955
 Pseudechiniscus conifer (Richters, 1904)
 Pseudechiniscus dicrani Mihelčič, 1938
 Pseudechiniscus facettalis Petersen, 1951
 Pseudechiniscus gullii Pilato & Lisi, 2006
 Pseudechiniscus insolitus Maucci, 1991
 Pseudechiniscus jiroveci Bartoš, 1963
 Pseudechiniscus juanitae de Barros, 1939
 Pseudechiniscus jubatus Biserov, 1990
 Pseudechiniscus megacephalus Mihelčič, 1951
 Pseudechiniscus nataliae Biserov & Maucci, 1986
 Pseudechiniscus novaezeelandiae (Richters, 1908)
 Pseudechiniscus occultus Dastych, 1980
 Pseudechiniscus papillosus Li, Wang, Liu & Su, 2005
 Pseudechiniscus pilatoi Li, 2007
 Pseudechiniscus pseudoconifer Ramazzotti, 1943
 Pseudechiniscus pulcher (Murray, 1910)
 Pseudechiniscus quadrilobatus Iharos, 1969
 Pseudechiniscus ramazzottii Maucci, 1952
 Pseudechiniscus santomensis Fontoura, Pilato & Lisi, 2010
 Pseudechiniscus scorteccii Franceschi, 1952
 Pseudechiniscus shilinensis Yang, 2002
 Pseudechiniscus spinerectus Pilato, Binda, Napolitano & Moncada, 2001
 Pseudechiniscus suillus (Ehrenberg, 1853)
 Pseudechiniscus titianae Vecchi, Cesari, Bertolani, Jönsson, Rebecchi & Guidetti, 2016
 Pseudechiniscus transsylvanicus Iharos, 1936
 Pseudechiniscus yunnanensis Wang, 2009

References

Further reading
Thulin, 1911 Beiträge zur Kenntnis der Tardigradenfauna Schwedens. Ark.Zool., Stockholm, vol. 7, p. 1-60
 Nomenclator Zoologicus info

Echiniscidae
Tardigrade genera